Gabriela Quijano (born 11 April 1975) is an Argentine alpine skier. She competed in four events at the 1994 Winter Olympics.

References

1975 births
Living people
Argentine female alpine skiers
Olympic alpine skiers of Argentina
Alpine skiers at the 1994 Winter Olympics
Sportspeople from Bariloche